Martin Fischer and Philipp Oswald were the defending champions but decided not to participate.
Santiago Giraldo and Cristian Rodríguez won the title, by defeating Andrea Arnaboldi and Gianluca Naso 4–6, 7–6(7–2), [10–3]

Seeds

Draw

Draw

References
 Main Draw

Distalnet Tennis Cup - Doubles
2013 - Doubles